Compass in the Blood is a young-adult novel by the American writer William E. Coles, Jr. (1932–2005) set in 1890's Pittsburgh, Pennsylvania.

Synopsis
It tells the story of Dee Armstrong, a freshman journalism student at the University of Pittsburgh, who is inspired to investigate one of the city's most notorious crimes. In 1902 Kate Soffel, the wife of the warden of the Allegheny County Jail, conducted an adulterous affair with a prisoner, Ed Biddle, and helped him and his brother Jack in a daring jailbreak.

References

2001 American novels
Novels set in Pittsburgh
University of Pittsburgh
Atheneum Books books